Don Troiani (born 1949) is an American painter whose work focuses on his native country's military heritage, mostly from the American Revolution, War of 1812 and American Civil War. His highly realistic and historically accurate oil and watercolor works are most well known in the form of marketed mass-produced printed limited-edition reproductions, illustrated books, book compilations, museum and government collections. He is also a militaria collector.

Biography
Troiani was born in New York City and studied at the Pennsylvania Academy of Fine Arts and New York City's Art Students League between 1967 and 1971.

Artistic style and historical accuracy
Don Troiani's paintings are realistic and academic in style, mostly oil on canvas or Gouache on paper. He uses posed models with clothing and equipment from his collection of original uniforms, equipage, insignia and weapons. Troiani also studies battlefields, weather conditions, and structures depicted in his paintings firsthand. In 1995, he designed the three Civil War battlefield commemorative coins for the United States Mint. His work has also appeared on a U.S. postal card commemorating the anniversary of the U.S. National Guard. Troiani is also a recipient of the Meritorious Service Award of the United States National Guard. Forty of his original paintings have been in a special exhibition at the "Museum of the American Revolution " in Philadelphia from October 2021 until September 2022.

Troiani's artwork has appeared on various media, including:

 NBC/Universal
 FOX NEWS
 CPTV
 CNN
 NPR (National Public Radio)
 America Online
 The O'Reilly Factor
  Colbert Report
 Madam Secretary , TV series
 A&E Military and Discovery channels
 U.S. Department of State
 The Washington Post
 "American Revolution Center"
 The New York Times
 PBS News Hour
 Los Angeles Times
 U.S. News & World Report
 The Washington Times
 National Geographic
 USA Today
 American Heritage*
 "FOX Nation" 
 American Rifleman
 American Indian Magazine
 Civil War Times
 The Arizona Republic
 America's Civil War
 The Hartford Courant
 Southwest Art
 Southern Accents
 The Boston Globe
 Connecticut Magazine
 Smithsonian
 Antiques and Arts Weekly
 Litchfield County Times
 Coin World
 Waterbury Republican American
 Civil War News
 Danbury News Times
 VFW Magazine
 The Courier News
 Barnes and Noble Books
 Sterling Publishing
 The Gettysburg Times
 America's Civil War
 The Bridgeport Post
 Military History
 Man at Arms
 Numismatist
 The Quarterly Journal of Military History
 Pallasch Magazine (Austria)
 P.M. Magazine (Germany)
 Publicat (Poland)
 International Churchill Society
 Militerhistorie (Norway)
 Confederate Veteran
 Art Business News
 Fine Art Connoisseur
 Civil War Preservation Trust
 The Times Picayune
 Warner Brothers Productions
  both publications of the Daughters/Sons of the American Revolution 
 Antiques Roadshow FYI Magazine
 Scholastic Inc
 Philadelphia Inquirer
 Ct Insider
 Broad Street Review
 Metro-Philly
 Trenton Times
 The Norwalk Hour
  "Dorling Kindersley "
  "Stride"
  "Houghton Mifflin Harcourt" 
  "Stackpole Books"
  "The Rowman & Littlefield Publishing Group, Inc."
  " Bonnier Publications"
  " America's Civil War Magazine"
  " Morningside Press"
  " Knox Press"
  " World History Group"
  " South Carolina Educational Television"
  " WCTV"

Militaria collector 
Troiani has an extensive collection of Civil War, War of 1812, Revolutionary War, and World War II uniforms, equipage, insignia and weapons. He also consults and appraises for museums and collectors on the subject of military artifacts. Items from his militaria collection have appeared in the Time-Life "Echoes Of Glory" series on the Civil War. Other artifacts of his have been loaned for exhibition at the Smithsonian Institution, Delaware Historical Society, Connecticut Museum of History, Museum of the American Revolution,  Pamplin Park, The West Point Museum, Virginia Historical Society, Museum of the American Revolution, and the National Park Service Visitors Center in Gettysburg, Pennsylvania.

Historical consultant
Troiani has been a consultant on Civil War uniforms and equipage for the feature film, Cold Mountain, 52 episodes of History Channel's Civil War Journal, and the 1994 A&E miniseries The American Revolution.

Institutions holding or displaying his work

 United States State Department
 Wisconsin Military Academy
 The Booth Museum of Western Art, Cartersville, GA.
 Smithsonian's Museum of History and Technology
 The Washington Monument
 Gettysburg National Historical Park
 National Museum of the United States Army, Fort Belvoir, Va.
 U.S. Army War College
 U.S. Marine Corps Museum
  Museum of the American Revolution, Philadelphia, PA.
 National Civil War Museum, Harrisburg, PA.
 Parks of Canada
 United States Mint
 West Point Museum
 The Pentagon, Washington, D.C.
 National Museum of African American History and Culture
 North Carolina Museum of History
 Pamplin Park
 Heritage Plantation, Sandwich, MA.
 National Civil War Museum, Harrisburg, PA
 Minuteman National Historical Park
 Boston Tea Party Ships and Museum, Boston, MA.
 Cowpens National Historical Park, 
 Fort Stanwix National Historical Park, Rome, N.Y.
 U.S. Cavalry Museum, Fort Riley, Kansas
 U.S. Army Center of Military History
 Pennsylvania Historical & Museum Commission
 Boston National Historical Park
 Oneida Indian Nation
 Saratoga National Historical Park
 Morristown National Historical Park
 U.S. Army National Guard Bureau
 Greensboro Historical Museum
 Fort Ticonderoga
 Guilford Court House National Park
 Virginia Museum of the Civil War, New Market VA
 Pritzker Military Museum & Library
 Union League of Philadelphia
 The African American Museum ,Philadelphia, Pa.
 National Museum of Military Vehicles

Books
Books authored and co-authored by Don Troiani:
 Don Troiani's Civil War (1995)  
 Soldiers in America 1754-1865 (1998)
 Military Buttons of the American Revolution (2001)
 Don Troiani's Soldiers of the American Revolution (2007)  
 Don Troiani's Regiments and Uniforms of the Civil War (2002)  
 Don Troiani's American Battles: the art of the nation at war, 1754-1865 (2006)  
 Insignia of Independence - Military Buttons and Accoutrement Plates of the American Revolution (2012) 
 Don Troiani's Civil War Soldiers (2017) 
 Don Troiani's Campaign to Saratoga-1777 (2019) 
 Don Troiani's Gettysburg: 36 Masterful Paintings and Riveting History of the Civil War's Epic Battle (2019) 
  Liberty Don Troiani's Paintings of the Revolutionary War (2021)

Notes

References
 "Artist Marches to Own (Military) Beat — Don Troiani," New York Times (November 17, 2002.)
 "An Armchair Commander," Los Angeles Times (January 2, 2004.)
 Hartford Courant
 "Washington Times"
 "American Rifleman" "The Arms Of April 19th 1775" 
 "Fine Art Connoisseur" June 20, 2022, Vol. 19, Issue 3, pages 098-105

External links

 Official Don Troiani Website
 Don Troiani Biography
 Photograph of Don Troiani, 2011 
 Photographs of Don Troiani 
 "Cleveland Banner"
 "The Daily Press"
 "L'Idea Magazine"

American war artists
20th-century American painters
American male painters
21st-century American painters
Academic art
Living people
Military art
Painters from New York (state)
1949 births
20th-century American male artists